Niko Kari (born 6 October 1999) is a Finnish racing driver who last raced in the FIA Formula 3 Championship with Jenzer Motorsport. He won his first single-seater championship, the 2015 SMP F4 Championship, in his debut year in car racing and is a former member of the Red Bull Junior Team.

Career

Karting
Kari started karting in 2009 and took part in his first race in 2010. He raced in several national karting series in Finland from 2010 to 2013. In 2014, Kari moved to KF European where he finished fifth overall.

Junior formulae
Kari moved to single-seaters in 2015, starting in the new SMP F4 Championship. He won seven races and took the title with three races to spare. Kari moved to European Formula 3 Championship in 2016 with Motopark. He took victory at the first race at Imola after a late lunge on Lance Stroll and finished fifth in the rookie standings and tenth overall.

GP3 Series and Formula 3

2016 
In August 2016, Kari was also announced to take part in the GP3 rounds at Spa-Francorchamps with Koiranen GP, in place of Ralph Boschung. He retired from the first race, and finished 14th in the second, scoring no points.

2017 
In November 2016, Helmut Marko confirmed Kari would move to the series full-time in 2017. In January, Kari was signed to Arden International. Kari finished the season with one race victory, one third place finish, 63 points and 10th place in drivers' championship. He was dropped from the Red Bull Junior Team after the season.

2018 
Kari continued to race in GP3 switching to MP Motorsport for the 2018 campaign. After 14 races into the season Kari was promoted to FIA Formula 2 Championship with MP Motorsport for the remainder of the 2018 season. As a result, Kari finished the season with three point scoring finishes, six total points, and a 17th place in the drivers' championship.

2019 
For the rebranded 2019 F3 season, Kari would drive for Trident Racing, and he would achieve two podiums, both 3rd place finished, in Barcelona and Sochi. He finished 12th in the championship with 36 points.

Formula 2 
Kari was promoted to FIA Formula 2 Championship with MP Motorsport for the last two weekends of the 2018 season replacing Ralph Boschung. He retired in both races held in Sochi, finished 15th in the first race of Yas Marina Circuit, and retired again in the season closing second race in Abu Dhabi.

Formula One
In December 2015, Kari, along with his Motopark teammate Sérgio Sette Câmara, became a member of the Red Bull Junior Team and thus becoming a test driver of Scuderia Toro Rosso. In November 2016, it was confirmed Kari would remain a part of the Junior team. In August of the following year, Kari was dismissed from the program.

European Le Mans Series
For the 2020 European Le Mans Series, Kari signed with EuroInternational, in the LMP3 class. They finished fourth overall in the category, with a 2nd, a 3rd, two 6th, and a 7th place finish during the year.

Return to racing 
In 2022, following a year out of racing, Kari joined Jenzer Motorsport in FIA Formula 3, partnering Ido Cohen and fellow Finn William Alatalo for the opening Bahrain round. He finished the races in 26th and 14th, the former race was derailed by a puncture. Following Bahrain, however, he would be replaced by Federico Malvestiti. Kari ranked 30th in the standings overall.

Racing record

Career summary

Complete SMP F4 Championship results
(key) (Races in bold indicate pole position) (Races in italics indicate fastest lap)

Complete FIA Formula 3 European Championship results
(key) (Races in bold indicate pole position) (Races in italics indicate fastest lap)

Complete GP3 Series results
(key) (Races in bold indicate pole position) (Races in italics indicate fastest lap)

† Driver did not finish the race, but was classified as he completed over 90% of the race distance.

Complete FIA Formula 2 Championship results
(key) (Races in bold indicate pole position) (Races in italics indicate points for the fastest lap of top ten finishers)

Complete FIA Formula 3 Championship results
(key) (Races in bold indicate pole position; races in italics indicate points for the fastest lap of top ten finishers)

† Driver did not finish the race, but was classified as he completed over 90% of the race distance.

Complete European Le Mans Series results
(key) (Races in bold indicate pole position; results in italics indicate fastest lap)

References

External links
 
 

1999 births
Living people
People from Hyvinkää
Finnish racing drivers
Karting World Championship drivers
FIA Formula 3 European Championship drivers
Finnish GP3 Series drivers
FIA Formula 2 Championship drivers
SMP F4 Championship drivers
FIA Formula 3 Championship drivers
Formula Regional European Championship drivers
Arden International drivers
MP Motorsport drivers
Trident Racing drivers
Sportspeople from Uusimaa
KIC Motorsport drivers
Jenzer Motorsport drivers
Koiranen GP drivers
European Le Mans Series drivers
Motopark Academy drivers
EuroInternational drivers
Le Mans Cup drivers